Mary Duff is an Irish country, pop and folk singer.

Personal life
Mary regularly tours with Daniel O'Donnell. Mary was married to her manager, Paul McKenna. They are now divorced.

Discography

Studio albums

Charting compilation albums

Singles

References

External links
  Official Mary Duff website
  Unofficial Fan Club site

Irish country singers
Irish women singers
Irish folk singers
Musicians from County Meath
Living people
Year of birth missing (living people)